John Aloysius Heving (April 29, 1896 – December 24, 1968) was an American professional baseball catcher. He played all or part of eight season in Major League Baseball (MLB) for the St. Louis Browns, Boston Red Sox, and Philadelphia Athletics. His younger brother, Joe, was a major league pitcher from 1930 to 1945.

Major league career

Browns and Red Sox 
A non-power hitting backup catcher, Having reached the majors in 1920 with the St. Louis Browns, appearing in one game with them. He spent the next three seasons out of professional baseball before returning to the majors with the Boston Red Sox in 1924-25. After spending 1926–27 with the minor league Toledo Mud Hens, he returned to the Red Sox in 1928-30. His most productive season came in 1929 with Boston, when he posted career highs in batting average (.319) and runs batted in (23) in 76 games played.

Athletics 
After the 1930 season, he was claimed on waivers by the Philadelphia Athletics, for whom he played in 1931-32. He hit his only major league home run for the A's on June 13, 1931 against his old team, the Browns, and pitcher Lefty Stewart.

Minor leagues 
In 1933, he returned to the minor leagues once again with the Toronto Maple Leafs. He continued to play on and off in the minors until 1946. From 1940 to 1942, he served as player-manager of the Salisbury Giants of the North Carolina State League.

In an eight-season major league career, Heving was a .265 hitter (261-for-985) with one home run and 90 RBI in 399 games.

Heving died in Salisbury, North Carolina, at the age of 72.

Notes

External links 

Retrosheet

Major League Baseball catchers
Boston Red Sox players
Philadelphia Athletics players
St. Louis Browns players
Battle Creek Custers players
Toledo Mud Hens players
Toronto Maple Leafs (International League) players
Buffalo Bisons (minor league) players
Fort Worth Cats players
Syracuse Chiefs players
Salisbury Giants players
Tallassee Indians players
Minor league baseball managers
Baseball players from Kentucky
Sportspeople from Covington, Kentucky
1896 births
1968 deaths